Corktown can refer to:

 Corktown, Toronto, Ontario, Canada, a neighbourhood
 Corktown, Hamilton, Ontario, Canada, a neighbourhood
 Corktown, Detroit, Michigan, United States
 Corktown, Ottawa, Ontario, Canada, a former neighbourhood in the city's early history